An Anganwadi is a type of rural child care centre in India. They were started by the Indian government in 1975 as part of the Integrated Child Development Services program to combat child hunger and malnutrition. Anganwadi in Hindi means  "courtyard shelter" in English.

A typical Anganwadi center provides basic health care in a village. It is a part of the Indian public health care system. Basic health care activities include contraceptive counseling and supply, nutrition education and supplementation, as well as pre-school activities. The centres may be used as depots for oral rehydration salts, basic medicines and contraceptives.
, as many as 13.3 lakh (a lakh is 100,000) Anganwadi and mini-Anganwadi centres (AWCs/mini-AWCs) are operational out of 13.7 lakh sanctioned AWCs/mini-AWCs. These centres provide supplementary nutrition, non-formal pre-school education, nutrition, and health education, immunization, health check-up and referral services of which the last three are provided in convergence with public health systems.

While as of latest 31 March 2021, 13.87 lakh Anganwadi and mini-Anganwadi centres (AWCs/mini-AWCs) are operational out of 13.99 lakh sanctioned AWC/mini-AWCs with the following categorization in the quarterly report :

 State/UT wise details of growth monitoring in Anganwadi Centres - Total children:-89.1+ lakh
 Total No. of AWCs/Mini-AWCs with Drinking water facility:-11.9+ lakh
 Total No. of AWCs/Mini-AWCs with toilet facility:-10+ lakh
 Other miscellaneous on rented/govt. buildings, nutritional coverage, pre-school education, vacant/in-position/sanctioned posts of AWWs/AWHs/CDPOs/Supervisors, etc.

Benefits 
Despite decades of impressive growth, India has an acute shortage of doctors. The doctor population ratio in 2019-20 was 1:1456; against the WHO recommended level of 1:1000. Through the Anganwadi system, the country is trying to meet its goal of providing affordable and accessible healthcare to local populations.

Anganwadi workers have the advantage over the physicians living in the same rural area, which gives them insight into the state of health in the locality and assists in identifying the cause of problems and in countering them. They also have better social skills and can therefore more easily interact with the local people. As locals, they know and are comfortable with the local language and ways, are acquainted with the people, and are trusted.

Challenges and solutions

Public policy discussions have taken place over whether to make Anganwadis universally available to all eligible children and mothers who want their children there. This would require significant increases in budgetary allocation and a rise in the number of Anganwadis to over 16 lakh.

The officers and their helpers who staff Anganwadis are typically women from poor families. The workers do not have permanent jobs with comprehensive retirement benefits like other government staff. Worker protests (by the All India Anganwadi Workers Federation) and public debates on this topic are ongoing. There are periodic reports of corruption and crimes against women in some Anganwadi centers. There are legal and societal issues when Anganwadi-serviced children fall sick or die.

In announcing the 2022 budget, then Indian Finance Minister Nirmala Sitharaman stated that salaries would be increased for Anganwadi workers to ₹20,105 per month and for helpers to ₹10,000 per month. But with minuscule increment in the overall umbrella budget of just 0.7%. It has been allocated ₹20,263 crore for the next fiscal, as compared to last year’s allocation of ₹20,105 crore. As compared to revised estimate of ₹199999.55 crore there is a 1.3% increase.

In March 2008 there was debate about whether packaged foods (such as biscuits) should become part of the food served. Detractors, including Nobel Prize winner Amartya Sen, argued against it, saying that it will become the only food consumed by the children. Options for increasing partnerships with the private sector are continuing.

In a major initiative, the work of Anganwadis is being digitized, starting with the 27 most economically disadvantaged districts in Uttar Pradesh: Bihar, Madhya Pradesh, Rajasthan, Odisha and Andhra Pradesh. In March 2021, Anganwadis' workers were provided with a smartphone app to record data that will be integrated with the health ministry, which is involved in carrying out immunization, health check-ups, and nutrition education under Integrated Child Development Services. They were informed that failure to 
upload digitally-entered records could result in salary and food suspension. Difficulties emerged with this smartphone app's reportedly being hard to use, being written in only English, and demanding more memory than cheap smartphones have. Anganwadi employees, mostly women who earn less than $150 a month, if they even have smartphones, experienced repeated crashes of this app or found that they do not understand enough English to use it. Many lack phone reception and electricity in their villages and ask why meticulously written ledgers, used for years, no longer suffice.

In order to ensure growth monitoring of children and home visits, an incentive of Rs. 500 and Rs. 250 is provided per month to Anganwadi Workers (AWWs) and Anganwadi Helpers (AWHs).

Integration with other official schemes 

The Integrated Child Development Services scheme did not have provision for the construction of AWC buildings as this was envisaged to be provided by the community except for the North Eastern States. For them, financial support was provided for construction of AWC buildings since 2001-02 at a unit cost of ₹175,000.

As part of the strengthening and restructuring the ICDS scheme, the government approved a provision of construction of 200,000 Anganwadi centre buildings at a cost of ₹450,000 per unit during XII Plan period in a phased manner with a cost-sharing ratio of 75:25 between centre and states (other than the NER, where it will be at 90:10).

Further, construction of AWC has been notified as a permissible activity under the Mahatma Gandhi National Rural Employment Guarantee Act (MNREGA). The construction of AWC buildings can be taken up in convergence with MNREGA.

Planned renaming of few schemes under new umbrella term i.e. Saksham Anganwadi and Poshan 2.0 includes anganwadi services, Poshan Abhiyan, scheme for adolescent girls, and national creche scheme.

International efforts

UNICEF and the UN Millennium Development Goals of reducing infant mortality and improving maternal care are the impetus for increasing focus on the Anganwadis. Workers and helpers are expected to be trained per WHO standards.

See also
 Auxiliary nurse midwife
 Accredited Social Health Activist

References

External links
 Official website
 Anganwadi services scheme
 ICDS
 Anganwadis of Kerala
 
 

Child care
Education in India
Hindi words and phrases
Rural development in India
Welfare in India
Indian missions